Bethel Merriday is a 1940 novel by Sinclair Lewis. It is a book depicting the journey of an aspiring young actress, and her life in a touring company. The company is performing a then-modern update on Romeo and Juliet.

References

1940 American novels
Romeo and Juliet